Udovenko is a Ukrainian surname. Notable people with the surname include:

 Hennadiy Udovenko (1931–2013), Ukrainian politician and diplomat
 Viktor Udovenko (born 1947), Ukrainian footballer

See also
 

Ukrainian-language surnames